Jake Paringatai (born 13 April 1980) is a New Zealand rugby union player who plays as a loose forward. Paringati currently plays for Poverty Bay in the Heartland Championship.  He has played Super Rugby for the and the Crusaders.

Paringatai also formally represented Northland, Munster and Fukuoka Sanix Blues.

Problems off the field earlier in his career, which included breaches of team protocol and culminated in a criminal charge when he was found guilty of groping a woman inside a bar during 2007 where as a result was fined $12,500, curtailed any aspirations he may have had of achieving higher honours, of which he had previously been touted for.

References

External links
 itsrugby.co.uk profile

1980 births
Living people
New Zealand rugby union players
Rugby union flankers
Crusaders (rugby union) players
Munster Rugby players
Highlanders (rugby union) players
Northland rugby union players
Munakata Sanix Blues players
New Zealand expatriate rugby union players
New Zealand expatriate sportspeople in Ireland
New Zealand expatriate sportspeople in Japan
Expatriate rugby union players in Ireland
Expatriate rugby union players in Japan
Māori All Blacks players
People from Paraparaumu
Rugby union players from the Wellington Region